Ulta is a 2019 Indian Malayalam-language comedy drama film written and directed by Suresh Poduval (in his directorial debut) and produced by Subash Cipy. The film stars Gokul Suresh, Anusree and Prayaga Martin, with Siddique, Ramesh Pisharody, Kalabhavan Shajohn and Surabhi Lakshmi in supporting roles.

Synopsis 
A utopian town managed by women discounts the festering resentment of their menfolk, whose devious plans unleash chaos and infighting in their little paradis

.

Cast

Production
Ulta is a comedy drama that marks the directorial debut of screenwriter Suresh Poduval, produced by Cipy Creative Works. Principal photography began by October 2018 in Kannur, Kerala.

Soundtrack

The film features original background score and songs composed by Gopi Sundar and Sudarsan.

Release

References

External links
 

2019 films
2010s Malayalam-language films
Films scored by Gopi Sundar
2019 directorial debut films
Indian comedy-drama films
Films shot in Kannur
2019 comedy-drama films